"Ready" is a song by American rapper B.o.B featuring fellow American rapper Future. Produced by Noel "Detail" Fisher, it was released on September 10, 2013, as the third single from the former's third studio album, Underground Luxury (2013). The song was also featured in the jukebox soundtrack for WWE 2K15.

Background 
In an interview with Rolling Stone, B.o.B spoke on why he decided to release "Ready" as the album's third single, saying: "I feel like it's the season where everybody's going back to school and football is back in season, which is one of my favorite sports, so I just felt like it was a great song for the time. Then me and Future, we're both from the east side [of Atlanta] so it felt like a real necessary move to make. What Future brings to the song is just crazy. Future came up with the hook and brought it to me first. I heard it and I loved it and so I spent a couple of days just trying to live with it and letting the music flow. The way I write now, I just try and let the music come to me. I really don't try to force anything, so if I catch something like a vibe or a feeling then I catch something and go with it and let that direct me. I feel like it's a more natural way to finish songs."

Music video
On August 22, 2013, B.o.B released a video compiling some of the greatest fights in sports history, with his song "Ready", playing in the background. On October 15, 2013, a teaser of the official music video was released online. The official video, directed by Mike Ho, was released later that day.

Chart performance

Release history

References

2013 songs
2013 singles
B.o.B songs
Songs written by B.o.B
Grand Hustle Records singles
Atlantic Records singles
Future (rapper) songs
Songs written by Detail (record producer)
Song recordings produced by Detail (record producer)
Songs written by Future (rapper)
Trap music songs